Martin Pence (November 18, 1904 – May 29, 2000) was a United States district judge of the United States District Court for the District of Hawaii.

Education and career

Born in Sterling, Kansas, Pence attended the UC Berkeley School of Law, but read law to enter the bar in 1928. He was in private practice of law in Hilo, Territory of Hawaii from 1936 to 1945. He was a judge of the Third Circuit Court of the Territory of Hawaii from 1945 to 1950. He returned to private practice in Hilo, Territory of Hawaii (State of Hawaii from 1959) from 1950 to 1961.

Federal judicial service

Pence was nominated by President John F. Kennedy on September 14, 1961, to the United States District Court for the District of Hawaii, to a new seat created by 73 Stat. 4. He was confirmed by the United States Senate on September 21, 1961, and received his commission on September 22, 1961. He served as Chief Judge from 1961 to 1974. He assumed senior status on November 18, 1974. His service was terminated on January 31, 2000, due to his retirement. He died on May 29, 2000, in Maunawili, Hawaii.

References

Sources
 

1904 births
2000 deaths
People from Sterling, Kansas
University of California, Berkeley alumni
UC Berkeley School of Law alumni
Territory of Hawaii judges
Judges of the United States District Court for the District of Hawaii
United States district court judges appointed by John F. Kennedy
20th-century American judges